Wiesbach may refer to following places, rivers and streams in Germany:
Places
 Wiesbach (Palatinate), municipality in the county of Südwestpfalz in Rhineland-Palatinate 

 Wiesbach (Ainring), village in the municipality of Ainring, county of Berchtesgadener Land, Bavaria
 Wiesbach (Eisenbach), village in the municipality of Eisenbach, county of Breisgau-Hochschwarzwald, Baden-Württemberg
 Wiesbach (Gangkofen), village in the borough of Markt Gangkofen, county of Rottal-Inn, Bavaria
 Wiesbach (Saar), village in the municipality of Eppelborn, county of Neunkirchen, Saarland 

Rivers and streams
 Wiesbach (Ill), left hand tributary of the Ill (in capitals; ILL) in Eppelborn, county of Neunkirchen, Saarland
 Wiesbach (Klinglbach), right hand tributary of the Klinglbach or the Perlbach (tributary of the Regen) near Wies, municipality of Rattenberg, county of Straubing-Bogen, Bavaria
 Wiesbach (Lech), left hand tributary of the Lech opposite Pitzling, borough of Landsberg am Lech, county of Landsberg am Lech, Bavaria 
 Wiesbach (Nahe), right hand tributary of the Nahe near Grolsheim, county of Mainz-Bingen, Rhineland-Palatinate
 Wiesbach (Our), left hand tributary of the Our above Wiescheid, Auw near Auw bei Prüm, Eifelkreis Bitburg-Prüm, Rhineland-Palatinate
 Wiesbach (Rott), left hand tributary of the Rott near Hörbering, borough of Neumarkt-Sankt Veit, county of Mühldorf am Inn, Bavaria
 Wiesbach, name of the upper reaches of the Auerbach, right hand tributary of the Schwarzbach in Niederauerbach, borough of Zweibrücken, Rhineland-Palatinate
 Wiesbach (Steinlach) or Oberwiesbach, right hand tributary of the Steinlach above Dußlingen, county of Tübingen, Baden-Württemberg
 Wiesbach (Usa), right hand tributary of the Usa near Kransberg, borough of Usingen, Hochtaunuskreis, Hesse   
 Wiesbach (Weil), right hand tributary of the Weil above Audenschmiede, municipality of Weilmünster, county of Limburg-Weilburg, Hesse